Millerelix is a genus of land snails in the family Polygyridae.

Species include:
Millerelix deltoidea – Oklahoma liptooth   
Millerelix dorfeuilliana – oakwood liptooth   
Millerelix fatigiata – bluegrass liptooth   
Millerelix gracilis – Edwards Plateau liptooth   
Millerelix jacksoni – Ozark liptooth   
Millerelix lithica – stone liptooth   
Millerelix mooreana – grassland liptooth   
Millerelix peregrina – white liptooth   
Millerelix plicata – Cumberland liptooth   
Millerelix simpsoni – Wyandotte liptooth   
Millerelix troostiana – Nashville liptooth

References

Polygyridae

pt:Millerelix peregrina